A number of ships have been named Tung An, including:

 , a Chinese cargo ship in service 1946–49
 , a Hong Kong registered cargo ship in service 1963–66

Ship names